Mounce Gore Butler (May 11, 1849 – February 13, 1917) was an American politician and a member of the United States House of Representatives for the 4th congressional district of Tennessee.

Biography
Butler was born on May 11, 1849 in Gainesboro, Tennessee in Jackson County, the son of Tennessee's 15th Secretary of State, Thomas H. Butler. Mounce Gore Butler attended the common schools, Old Philomath Academy, and the law department of Cumberland University in Lebanon, Tennessee. He was admitted to the bar in 1871 and commenced practice in the area of Gainesboro.

Career
Butler was a delegate to all Democratic state conventions from 1872 to 1916. From 1894 to 1902, he was the attorney general for the fifth judicial circuit of Tennessee.

Elected as a Democrat to the Fifty-ninth Congress, Butler was an unsuccessful candidate for renomination in 1906. He served from March 4, 1905 to March 3, 1907.  He resumed the practice of his profession in Gainesboro, Tennessee in Jackson County.

Death
Butler died in Gainsboro on February 13, 1917. He is interred in Gainesboro Cemetery.

References

External links

1849 births
1917 deaths
People from Gainesboro, Tennessee
Democratic Party members of the United States House of Representatives from Tennessee
19th-century American politicians